Pitar may refer to:
 Pitar, a bivalve genus
 Pitar (rank), a historical Romanian rank for a bread supplier